Russia–Serbia relations are the bilateral foreign relations between the Russian Federation and the Republic of Serbia. 
The countries established official diplomatic relations as Russian Empire and Principality of Serbia in 1816. Russia has an honorary consulate and embassy in Belgrade, and a liaison office to UNMIK, the capital of the disputed territory of Kosovo. Serbia has an embassy in Moscow, an honorary consulate in St. Petersburg, and has announced to open a consulate-general in Yekaterinburg.

While geographically not close, Serbia and Russia are both Slavic and Eastern Orthodox Christian countries and thus share a notable cultural heritage . Both countries were full members of the Council of Europe (until Russia's expulsion in 2022) and the Organization for Security and Co-operation in Europe.

After the dissolution of the USSR, the Socialist Federal Republic of Yugoslavia recognized Russia in December 1991 by the Decision of the Presidency on the recognition of the former republics of the USSR.

Diplomatic relations between the Kingdom of Yugoslavia and the USSR were established on 24 June 1940, and Serbia and the Russian Federation recognize the continuity of all inter-State documents signed between the two countries. There are about 70 bilateral treaties, agreements and protocols signed in the past. Serbia and the Russian Federation have signed and ratified 43 bilateral agreements and treaties in diverse areas of mutual cooperation so far.

According to censuses, there were 3,247 ethnic Russians living in Serbia (2011) and 3,510 Serbs with Russian citizenship (2010).

Russia and Serbia are both predominantly Slavic and Eastern Orthodox countries, which share a strong mutual cultural affinity. The countries have been close allies for centuries; and the friendship between them has been strongly maintained despite Serbia's recent attempt to maintain closer relations with the West.

History

Middle Ages

After the Ottoman invasion of Serbia in the 14th century, Serbian refugees found refuge in Russia. Lazar the Serb (built the first mechanical public clock in Russia) and Pachomius the Serb (hagiographer and translator) were some of the notable Serbs in Russian medieval history. Elena Glinskaya (1510–1538), the mother of Russian emperor Ivan the Terrible (r. 1547–84), was maternally Serbian. The Orthodox worship of Saint Sava was established in Russia in the 16th century.

18th century

In the 1750s, in a re-settlement initiated by Austrian Colonel Ivan Horvat, a vast number of Orthodox Serbs, mostly from territories controlled by the Habsburg monarchy (the Serbian Grenzers), settled in Russia's military frontier region of New Serbia (with the centre in Novomirgorod, mainly in the territory of present-day Kirovohrad Oblast of Ukraine), as well as in Slavo-Serbia (now mainly the territory of the Luhansk Oblast of Ukraine). In 1764, both territorial entities were incorporated in Russia's Novorossiya Governorate.

19th century–1900s
After the Ottoman Empire had allied itself with Napoleon in late 1806, and was attacked by Russia and Britain, it sought to meet the demands of the Serbian rebels under Karađorđe. Russian diplomat and agent Konstantin Rodofinikin initially proposed that Serbia becomes a protectorate of the Russian Empire and that Russian garrisons be stationed in Serbia as well as a high representative which would oversee the affairs in the country. Karađorđe refused the proposition claiming that it would turn Serbia into a Russian province. At the same time, the Russians offered the Serbs aid and cooperation. The Serbs accepted the Russians′ offer over autonomy under the Ottomans (as set by the "Ičko's Peace") and signed an alliance with the Russian Empire in July 1807: Karađorđe was to receive arms, and military and medical missions; nevertheless the terms of Russo-Turkish settlement agreed in May 1812 effectively provided for Turkish re-occupation of Serbia, and the First Serbian Uprising was definitively suppressed in October 1813. The Second Serbian Uprising (April 1815 – July 1817) achieved Serbian autonomy within the Ottoman Empire, which was internationally recognised through the Russo-Turkish Akkerman Convention (October 1826, solemnly announced in the cathedral in Kragujevac in the presence of Prince Miloš Obrenović) and the Treaty of Adrianople (September 1829). Serbia was thus put under Russian protection, although Russia was unable to exert control as it did in Wallachia and Moldavia, territories also dealt with in the Akkerman Convention. Serbian autonomy was briefly abolished by the Ottoman sultan in 1828, then re-granted in 1829. Russian protection was recognized until abolition thereof in 1856, after the Russian defeat in the Crimean War.

In February 1838, in his residence in Kragujevac Prince Miloš Obrenović received the first Russian consul, Gerasim Vashchenko.

In June 1876, Serbia, along with the Principality of Montenegro, declared independence and war on the Ottoman Empire. The war eventually ended with Serbian victory in March 1878, while Russia had been involved in its own war with Turkey (April 1877 – March 1878), with the final settlement of both wars decided by the great powers at the Congress of Berlin (1878). The Treaty of Berlin (July 1878), whose deliberations and decisions were greatly influenced by Austria-Hungary′s Gyula Andrássy, recognised Serbia's independence, yet left Serbia's ruling class disgruntled at Russia, who was seen as favouring the newly established Principality of Bulgaria at the expense of Serbia. In line with Andrássy's idea that Vienna, in order to neutralise inimical irredentist tendencies, should establish close legally binding ties with all her neighbours with whom she had ethnic connections, Austria-Hungary, which bordered Serbia to the north (modern Vojvodina), and the west (Bosnia and Herzegovina), sought to integrate Serbia economically by concluding a series of trade conventions with her and pressured Milan Obrenović to enter into a comprehensive bilateral political treaty. In June 1881, Serbian Prince Milan Obrenović and Austria-Hungary concluded a secret convention that effectively turned Serbia into Vienna′s client state. In turn, Russia in the 1880s intensified her courtship of Montenegro. Prince Nikola I of Montenegro was a regular visitor to Saint Petersburg and was awarded the Russian Empire's highest decoration by Alexander III in 1889.

Serbia's People's Radical Party, which was founded by reputed Russophile Nikola Pašić in 1881 and gained parliament majority by 1891, sought to free the country of Austro-Hungarian dependence. Serbia was defeated in the war with Bulgaria in 1885, and the Bulgarian unification was internationally recognized. Meanwhile, tensions between Serbia and Austria-Hungary grew. Serbian pretensions in creating a South Slavic state (Yugoslavism as opposed to Austro-Slavism) put fear in Austria-Hungary of potential devastation of the Austro-Hungarian empire. On the other hand, Russia became increasingly disappointed in Bulgaria, where the rulers of the German dynasties, Alexander of Battenberg and from 1887 Ferdinand I, pursued policies that Russia opposed. The visit to Saint Petersburg of Austrian Emperor Franz Joseph and his conference with Nicholas II of Russia in 1897 heralded a secret agreement between the two empires to honour and seek to maintain the status quo in the Balkans, which was in line with Vienna's attempts to forestall an emergence of a large Slavic state in the region. The 1901 massacres of Serbs in Kosovo was instrumental in causing a diplomatic conflict between Austria-Hungary, which supported the Albanians, and Serbia, which was supported by Russia.

Serbian King Alexander I was assassinated in a coup d'état in 1903, which ushered in the extinction of Obrenović dynasty and return of the Russophile Karađorđević dynasty: the new political regime of prime minister Nikola Pašić under King Peter I Karađorđević re-orientated Serbia towards Russia. Serbia was supported by Russia in the economic Pig War (1906–08) with Austria-Hungary. Austria-Hungary annexed Bosnia and Herzegovina in 1908; Russia did not interfere in the Bosnian crisis. The "National Defence" (Narodna Odbrana) organization was founded following the annexation, and sought to liberate Serb territories from Austro-Hungarian rule.

World War I

One of the factors that led to the beginning of World War I was close bilateral relations between the Kingdom of Serbia and the Russian Empire. While Russia and Serbia were not formally allied, Russia openly sought political and religious influence in Serbia. In May 1914, Serbian politics were polarized between two factions, one headed by the Prime Minister Nikola Pašić, and the other by the radical nationalist chief of Military Intelligence, Colonel Dragutin Dimitrijević, known by his codename Apis. In that month, due to Colonel Dimitrijević's intrigues, King Peter dismissed Pašić's government,  but the Russian Minister in Belgrade intervened to have Pašić's government restored. Pašić, though he often talked in public, knew that Serbia was near-bankrupt and, having suffered heavy casualties in the Balkan Wars and in the suppression of an Albanian revolt in Kosovo, needed peace. Since Russia also favoured peace in the Balkans, from the Russian viewpoint it was desirable to keep Pašić in power. However, the Assassination of Archduke Franz Ferdinand led Austria-Hungary to declare war on Serbia during the July Crisis.  Russia mobilised its armed forces in late July ostensibly to defend Serbia, but also to maintain status as a Great Power, gain influence in the Balkans and deter Austria-Hungary and Germany.  This led Germany to declare war on Russia on 1 August, ultimately expanding the local conflict into a world war.

Inter-war period, Russian emigration

A few months after the Russian Revolution in November 1917, the Russian Civil War ensued, in which a small number of mercenaries from Yugoslavia fought for both the Russian Whites and the Bolsheviks. After the Civil War ended in 1922 in a Bolshevik victory, relations between the Kingdom of Yugoslavia and the Soviet Union remained frosty. It was not until June 1940 that the Kingdom of Yugoslavia formally recognised the USSR and established diplomatic relations, one of the last European countries to do so.

Since 1920, the government of the Kingdom of SHS welcomed tens of thousands of anti-Bolshevik Russian refugees, mainly those who fled after the final defeat of the Russian Army under General Pyotr Wrangel in Crimea in November 1920, explaining its hospitality by presenting it as paying back the debt Serbia owed Russia for the latter's intervention on the side of Serbia at the outbreak of WWI. The Kingdom of SHS became home for 40,000 exiles from the Russian Empire. In 1921, at the invitation of the Serbian Patriarch Dimitrije, the leadership of the Russian Church in exile moved from Constantinople to Serbia and in September 1922 in Karlovci (until 1920, the seat of the abolished Patriarchate of Karlovci) established a de facto independent ecclesiastical administration that a few years later was instituted as the Russian Orthodox Church Outside Russia (ROCOR). The exiled Russian clergy's devotion and dedication to the Church was held up as an example by the churchpeople in Serbia. The ROCOR's Head Metropolitan Anthony Khrapovitsky was widely viewed as a spiritual leader of all the Russian émigrés until his death in 1936.  Patriarch Varnava of Serbia (1930–1937) came to be a staunch defender and advocate of the Russian exiles in Yugoslavia and exerted constant pressure on the Royal Court and government to forestall any rapprochement and establishment of diplomatic relations between Yugoslavia and the USSR. The Russian community in the Kingdom of Yugoslavia was effectively in a privileged position in a number of ways, as it enjoyed support and protection on the part of the Karađorđević dynasty.

The Russian military servicemen under the command of Gen Pyotr Wrangel were partly enlisted into Yugoslavia's border guard troops and deployed on the country's south-eastern and later north-western border. This service was terminated by a law passed in April 1922 that abolished the border guard troops; in 1923–1924 Wrangel's men were engaged in a contract to build a road between Kraljevo and Raška.

At the Genoa Conference in spring of 1922, there occurred a spat between Soviet Russia's delegation and that of the Kingdom of SHS over the absence of a delegation from Montenegro; a meeting between  Georgy Chicherin and Momčilo Ninčić took place on the sidelines of the conference: the sides arrived at a pro forma agreement that the government of the Kingdom would prevent further activities of Russian émigrés in its territory. Nevertheless, Russian émigré activity continued apace: multiple Russian military officers′ associations were set up in Yugoslavia, which in 1924 were united under an umbrella council headed by the seniormost Russian generals Eduard Ekk and Georgiy Rozalion-Soshalsky. In 1924, a cavalry brigade staffed completely by Wrangel's men was formed under the command of Russian Gen Sergei Ulagay in order to overthrow Albania′s pro-Soviet Orthodox leader Fan Noli, who had seized power in June that year, and re-install Muslim Ahmet Zogu, which was carried out in December that year. On 1 September 1924, Gen Pyotr Wrangel founded the Russian All-Military Union (ROVS), until 1927 headquartered in Karlovci, a global organisation designed to unite all Russian military officers outside Russia. According to the data contained in the declassified UDBA study compiled in 1955, in 1934 ROVS's  membership in Yugoslavia totaled 25.000 people. Department IV of ROVS (Yugoslavia) was established with headquarters in Belgrade, Gen Eduard Ekk heading it until 1933. Department IV was in constant liaison with Yugoslavia's Ministry of the Army and Navy.

The USSR's intelligence agencies were undertaking efforts to recruit agents in Yugoslavia from the early 1930s, including from among the White emigres such as Leonid Linitsky, who was exposed and arrested by the Yugoslavian police in 1935.

In 1938, the Soviet government sponsored a planned coup d'état designed to remove the Stojadinović government, which was resented by Edvard Beneš, the president of Czechoslovakia, and establish an anti-German military regime: Soviet intelligence officer Pyotr Zubov was given $200,000 in cash meant for the Serbian military officers selected by Czechs to execute the coup; the plan failed, as Zubov, after judging the Serbian officers to be unfit for the mission, refused to make advance payment.

Soviet influence, World War II

While Yugoslavia remained a monarchy, Communist elements in Yugoslavia retained some influence in the National Assembly (in December 1920, the government prohibited all Communist activities). Relations between Yugoslavian Communists and the officials of the Soviet Union were developed. Initial relations, however, remained tense. In 1937, for example, Stalin had the Secretary-General of the League of Communists of Yugoslavia, Milan Gorkić, murdered in Moscow during the Great Purge.

At the end of June 1940, the first Soviet ambassador (″polpred″, i.e. plenipotentiary representative) to Yugoslavia, Viktor Plotnikov, was appointed.

The March 1941 coup d'état against the pro-German government of Yugoslavia, while primarily backed by the UK government, was also actively supported by Soviet intelligence agencies, GRU and NKVD, following Stalin′s instructions, with a view to strengthening the USSR's strategic position in the Balkans. On 5 April 1941, the new government of Yugoslavia and the USSR signed the Treaty of Friendship and Non-Aggression, which did not commit the parties to military assistance in case of aggression.

According to Soviet General Pavel Sudoplatov, the Soviet leadership was shocked by an instant defeat of Yugoslavia in April 1941, after Hitler reacted to the coup ″promptly and effectively″.

The USSR formally severed relations with Yugoslavia on 8 May 1941, but in practice yet before that.

After Germany attacked the Soviet Union on 22 June 1941, the USSR began to assist the military campaign of Communist partisans led by Tito; and from the autumn of 1944 regular Red Army troops directly participated in battles in cooperation with the Partisans, especially in the territories of present-day Serbia. The most notable of these battles in which Soviet soldiers fought in Serbian territories was the Belgrade Offensive.

The ROVS′ Department IV (Yugoslavia) was the only regional branch of the Russian All-Military Union that made a decision to side with Germany against the USSR and ROVS participated in forming the Russian Protective Corps that was established in Serbia in September 1941. The Russian Corps was engaged in guarding important sites and also combating the Communist partisans led by Tito.

Socialist Yugoslavia and USSR
 

After the war ended in May 1945, King Peter II was not allowed to return to Yugoslavia; in November 1945 he was formally deposed by Yugoslavia's Communist Constituent Assembly with the state reorganised as a republic and renamed Federal People's Republic of Yugoslavia (FPR Yugoslavia or FPRY; from 1963 Socialist Federal Republic of Yugoslavia, or SFRY). Initially, Yugoslavia's Communist regime under Josip Broz Tito was loyal to Joseph Stalin′s Kremlin. The latter wanted Yugoslavia to become a member of the USSR-led block of Communist countries. However, Tito eventually rejected Stalin's pressure and in 1950s became one of the founders of the Non-Aligned Movement, which was regarded as the third way, neither adhering to the U.S.-led NATO, nor joining the Moscow-dominated Warsaw Pact.

As early as on 11 April 1945, the USSR concluded a friendship treaty with Josip Tito, who put signature on behalf of the Regent Council of Yugoslavia.

In the first two years following the war, relations between FPRY and the Soviet leadership, which during that period sought to accommodate the USSR's Western allies demands in Europe, were not entirely free of disagreements on a number of issues, such as Yugoslavia's territorial claims to Italy's Free Territory of Trieste and the part of Austria's Carinthia populated by Carinthian Slovenes, Tito's efforts to play a leading role in the entire Balkans region, as well as over Stalin's reluctance to decisively support the Greek Communists in the Greek Civil War, who were actively supported by Yugoslavia, Bulgaria, and Albania. Drastic deterioration in relations occurred in early 1948. In June 1948, Tito did not attend the second conference of the Cominform, which was established on the initiative of the USSR in September 1947 as a coordinating body for Communist parties in the USSR, Bulgaria, Hungary, Poland, Italy, France, Czechoslovakia, Romania, and Yugoslavia. The conference, on the motion of the VKP(B), was mostly dedicated to the discussion of the situation in the Communist Party of Yugoslavia. On 28 June 1948, the other member countries adopted a resolution that noted that ″recently the leadership of the Communist Party of Yugoslavia had pursued an incorrect line on the main questions of home and foreign policy, a line which represents a departure from Marxism-Leninism″; the resolution concluded by stating, ″the Central Committee of the Communist Party of Yugoslavia has placed itself and the Yugoslav Party outside the family of the fraternal Communist Parties, outside the united Communist front and consequently outside the ranks of the Information Bureau.″ The assumption in Moscow was that once it was known that he had lost Soviet approval, Tito would collapse. The expulsion effectively banished Yugoslavia from the international association of socialist states, while other socialist states of Eastern Europe subsequently underwent purges of alleged "Titoists". Stalin took the matter personally and attempted, unsuccessfully, to assassinate Tito on several occasions.

The following year, the crisis nearly escalated into an armed conflict, as Hungarian and Soviet forces were massing on the northern Yugoslav frontier. In May 1949, the Ministry of foreign affairs of Yugoslavia formally protested against the support rendered by the USSR to a group of Yugoslav citizens who had formed a committee in Moscow in early April to promote ″unfriendly activity against the FPRY" (the ministry's note of 23 May 1949). The Soviet response dated 31 May 1949 asserted the USSR's right to offer asylum to "Yugoslav revolutionary emigrants″ and stated that Yugoslavia′s government ″had forfeited the right to expect a friendly attitude″ from the USSR, as it had established an ″anti-Communist and anti-democratic terrorist regime″ in Yugoslavia and was fighting against the Soviet Union. On 19 November 1949, the Kominform adopted another resolution on the Communist Party of Yugoslavia, which stated that the CPY had been hijacked by a group of ″murderers and spies" and declared that fighting against the "Tito gang" was a duty of all communist and workers′ parties.

After Stalin's death, relations underwent normalisation heralded by the signing of the Belgrade declaration in June 1955, which expressly rescinded Stalin's policies towards Yugoslavia. Nevertheless, the SFRY never joined the USSR-led political and military block of socialist countries and remained one of the leading members of the Non-Aligned Movement, a grouping of countries that sought to be neutral in the Cold War. However, Yugoslav government's permission to Soviet Air Force to fly over the country, allowed Soviet Union to send advisors, weapons and troops to Egypt between Six-Day War and Yom Kippur War. Economic and cultural ties between the USSR and SFRY developed successfully until the late 1980s.

1991–2000
The breakup of Yugoslavia and the dissolution of the Soviet Union occurred nearly concurrently. Throughout the 1990s, FR Yugoslavia was hard hit with sanctions from the western world; meanwhile Russia was undergoing painful structural reforms that were accompanied by a steady economic decline in production until 1999. Relations between the countries were largely neglected until the spring 1999.

In 1998, the Kosovo War began, followed by break-up of relations between Yugoslavia and the West and to the NATO bombing of Yugoslavia, which Russia strongly condemned. In March 1999, Russian president Boris Yeltsin described NATO's military action against sovereign Yugoslavia as an ″open aggression″. Russia condemned NATO at the United Nations and supported the statement that NATO air strikes on Serbia were an illegal military action. Volunteers and mercenaries from Russia were cited to have gone to Kosovo in large numbers to fight the KLA, and to resist and complicate NATO operations. Around the time of the bombing, a Russia-friendly rhetoric developed in the Serbian political team as Borislav Milošević, the brother of Slobodan Milošević and the Yugoslav ambassador to Moscow at the time, proposed that the Federal Republic of Yugoslavia could join the Union State which is composed by Belarus and Russia.

2000–present

After Vladimir Putin became the President of Russia at the start of 2000, months after the NATO bombing of Yugoslavia, relations between the countries began to gain momentum. Following the overthrow of Slobodan Milošević, the new President of Yugoslavia Vojislav Koštunica paid a visit to Putin in October 2000.

In January 2008, a major deal was struck between Moscow and Belgrade that by the end of the year transferred 51 percent of Serbia's oil and gas company Naftna Industrija Srbije (NIS) to Russia's Gazprom Neft (a subsidiary of Gazprom) in exchange for 400 million Euros and 550 mln Euros of investments; later Gazprom increased its stake in NIS to 56,5 percent.

In April 2012, Ivica Dačić, then Deputy Prime Minister of Serbia and the Minister of Internal Affairs of Serbia, and Vladimir Puchkov, Deputy Minister of Emergency Situations of Russia, opened the Russian-Serbian Humanitarian Center in Niš, an intergovernmental nonprofit organization. While Serbia has intensive military cooperation with NATO (Serbia's military-to-military cooperation with the U.S. being much bigger than with Russia) and in early 2016 the Serbian parliament ratified an agreement that granted NATO staff freedom of movement in the Serbian territory and diplomatic immunity, the Serbian government has refused to grant similar status to the Russian-Serbian Humanitarian Center in Niš.

The visit to Russia by Serbia's president Aleksandar Vučić in December 2017 was hailed by Politika as a symbolic ending of ″decades of stagnation in relations″. In November 2019 Serbian security services revealed activities of Russian intelligence operatives who were meeting and passing money to Serbian army officials.

Serbia did not impose sanctions on Russia following the crisis in Ukraine and the annexation of Crimea in 2014.

On 25 February 2022, in response to the Russian invasion of Ukraine, Vučić stated that while Serbia felt it was wrong to violate the territorial integrity of Ukraine, it also felt that it was not in Serbia's interest to impose sanctions against Russia. On 11 March 2022, the People's Patrol, a far-right anti-immigrant and vigilante group, held a rally in support of Russia in Belgrade, attended by thousands of pro-Russia Serbs. On 21 March, a protest against Russia's invasion of Ukraine took place in the Serbian capital. It was the second reported pro-Ukraine demonstration since the start of the war, with the first one organised by peace activists and Russians living in Serbia. In the following month, more demonstrations in support of Ukraine were held. Pro-Ukraine demonstrations have attracted smaller numbers of participants than that of ones in support of the invasion.

In March 2022, Serbia voted in favour of the UN General Assembly resolution condemning Russia's invasion of Ukraine. In April, Serbia voted in favour of expelling Russia from the UN Human Rights Council.

In January 2023, Vučić emphasized that Serbia cannot and will not support Russia’s invasion of Ukraine, stating, “For us, Crimea is Ukraine, Donbas is Ukraine, and it’ll remain so.” This statement is a significant shift in Serbia’s position since Putin’s invasion of Ukraine almost 11 months ago. Vučić clarified that it would be wrong to assume that his government fully endorses the leadership in Moscow, stating “We are not always jubilant about some of their stances. We have a traditionally good relationship, but it doesn’t mean that we support every single decision or most of the decisions that are coming from the Kremlin.”

Kosovo issue
Russia has backed Serbia's position regarding Kosovo. Vladimir Putin said that any support for Kosovo's unilateral declaration is immoral and
illegal. He described the recognition of Kosovo's unilaterally declared independence by several major world powers as "a terrible precedent" that "breaks up the entire system of international relations" that have taken "centuries to evolve", and "undoubtedly, it may entail a whole chain of unpredictable consequences to other regions in the world" that will come back to hit the West "in the face". During an official state visit to Serbia following the declaration, Russian President-elect Dmitry Medvedev reiterated support for Serbia and its stance on Kosovo.

Russia has also said that the March 2008 riots in Tibet were linked with the recognition by some states of the independence of Serbia's breakaway province, Kosovo. Foreign Minister Sergey Lavrov, in an interview with a Russian newspaper, also linked the demands for greater autonomy by ethnic Albanians in North Macedonia with the Kosovo issue. Lavrov said, "There are grounds to presume that this is not occurring by chance. You can see what is happening in Tibet, how the separatists there are acting. The Albanians in [North] Macedonia are already demanding a level of autonomy that is a clear step toward independence. Furthermore, events in other areas of the world give us grounds to assume that we are only at the beginning of a very precarious process".

On 23 March 2008 Vladimir Putin ordered urgent humanitarian aid for Kosovo Serb enclaves. Prime Minister of Kosovo, Hashim Thaci, opposed the Russian plan for sending aid to Kosovo Serbs. He stated that Russia could only send aid if it was agreed and coordinated with Government in Pristina.

On July 15, President Dmitry Medvedev stated in a major foreign policy speech "For the EU, Kosovo is almost what Iraq is to the United States.... This is the latest example of the undermining of international law".

On 29 May 2009, President Dmitry Medvedev described Serbia as a "key partner" for Russia in Southeast Europe and announced "We intend to continue to coordinate our foreign policy moves in future, including the ones related to the solving of the issue with Kosovo".

Russian ambassador to Serbia Aleksandr Konuzin told a Belgrade daily in June 2009 that "Russia's stand is rather simple — we are ready to back whatever position Serbia takes (with regards to Kosovo)."

Although Russia is antagonistic to Kosovo's independence, nonetheless Russia has supported Donald Trump-brokered normalization agreements between Kosovo and Serbia in 2020.

Economic relations

Trade
In 2016, trade between Russia and Serbia totalled $1.657 bn, having grown by 1,32 percent against 2015; Russia's export to Serbia totalled $770.2 mln, a decrease by 9.34 percent; Russia's import from Serbia was at $886.8 mln, an increase by 12.84 percent.

In 2017, 70 percent of Russia's export to Serbia was said to be hydrocarbons, natural gas being the primary export item; from 2013 to 2016 exports of Russian gas to Serbia dropped from 2 bn to 1.7 billion cubic meters. In 2013, Gazprom offered a 13 percent discount on its gas export price for Serbia, to be effective until 2021.

In December 2017, Russia cancelled the requirement for Serbia to consume its gas only on the domestic market, thus allowing Serbia to re-export the fuel; a Russian government document published on 18 December amended the 2012 contract for gas supplies until 2021 for the volume of 5 billion cubic meters per year.

Companies
Naftna Industrija Srbije, the best performing company of Serbia, is majority owned by the Russian company Gazprom Neft, a subsidiary of the government-controlled Gazprom.

Travel
Russia and Serbia have shared a visa-free policy for travelers going between the two countries since 2008.

Military cooperation

The Serbian Armed Forces and its arms industry have since the Soviet-Yugoslavia period been dependent on Soviet/Russian technology.

In June 2016, Serbia received two Russian Mi17 utility helicopters that it purchased for 25 million euros.

In December 2016, the two countries signed a military-technical assistance agreement that allowed Serbia to receive as a gift: six Mikoyan MiG-29 fighters, 30 modernized T-72 main battle tanks and 30 BRDM-2 armored vehicles. The fighters were delivered in October 2017, the armored vehicles are expected to be delivered in 2018.

Russia supplies three-kilogram radio-electronic counter gun Pishchal (also being supplied to the Russian law enforcement agencies) and fixed radio-electronic complexes Taran to Serbia and South Ossetia in 2018.

Serbia takes part in Russo-Belarus-Serbian military war games called 'Slavic Brotherhood' and is also being supplied with Chaborz M-3 combat buggies. 3 weapons contracts were signed in early 2019.

In recent years, the military cooperation between Serbia and Russia has grown stronger. Since the beginning of 2022, Serbia has purchased multiple pieces of Russian military hardware, such as the Pantsir-S1 air defense system and 9M133 Kornet anti-tank missiles, despite the threat of US sanctions.

Education
Yugoslavia and the Russian Federation signed the Agreement on cooperation in the Fields of Culture, Education, Science and Sports on July 19, 1995. Based on this, the Program of Cooperation in the Areas of Education, Science and Culture was signed in December 2001 for the period 2002–04. The Days of Culture of the Russian Federation were held in Serbia and Montenegro in 2002 and those of Serbia and Montenegro in the Russian Federation in 2003.

The Russian Centre for Science and Culture in Belgrade opened on April 9, 1933. Popular name of the centre is Russian Home.

Demographics
 
According to censuses there were 3,247 Russians living in Serbia (2011) and 3,510 Serbs living in Russia (2010). There were 11,043 speakers of Serbian language in Russia, out of which 3,330 were native speakers and 3,179 native speakers of Russian in Serbia. According to 2015 data there were 29,499 Serbian citizens in Russia. According to 2013 data there were 3,290 Russian citizens in Serbia.

Popular culture

One of the most successful and prestigious hotels in Belgrade, Hotel Moskva is named after Russia's capital. It has been on separate occasions the host to Anatoly Karpov, Mikhail Kalashnikov, Maxim Gorky, and many other prominent Russians.

See also
Foreign relations of Serbia
Foreign relations of Russia
Embassy of Serbia in Moscow
List of ambassadors of Russia to Yugoslavia
Russians in Serbia
Serbs in Russia
Serbia–United States relations

References

Sources

Further reading
 

 Trivanovitch, Vaso. "Serbia, Russia, and Austria during the Rule of Milan Obrenovich, 1868-78" Journal of Modern History (1931) 3#3 pp. 414–440 online
Nikolaevna, P.M. and Leonidovič, Č.A., 2017. Serbia and the Serbs in the Russian press: Stereotypes and images. Nasleđe, Kragujevac, 14(37-1), pp. 13–25.
Černobrovkin, A.V., 2017. Russian-Serbian cooperation: Culturological aspect. Nasleđe, Kragujevac, 14(37-1), pp. 39–47.

Ivanova, Ekaterina Vladimirovna, and Jovana Blažić Pejić. "Писма митрополита Михаила грофици АД Блудовој: Прилог проучавању руско-српских односа (1871-1874)." Мешовита грађа 35 (2014): 121–138.
Leovac, Danko Lj. Србија и Русија за време друге владавине кнеза Михаила:(1860-1868). Diss. Универзитет у Београду, Филозофски факултет, 2014.

External links

Embassy of Russia in Belgrade
Embassy of Serbia in Moscow
Межгосударственные отношения России и Сербии

 
Serbia
Bilateral relations of Serbia